Sohrai is a harvest festival of the Indian states of  Jharkhand, West Bengal, Chhattisgarh, Odisha, and Bihar. It also called cattle festival. It is celebrated after harvest and coincide with Govardhan Puja of Diwali festival. It is celebrated by Sadan, Oraons, Munda and Santal among others.

It is celebrated on Amavasya of the Hindu month Kartik in the month of October–November. In this festival, people fast, paint house, prepared food. In night, they light earthen lamps in the cattle-sheds and offered sacrifice to deity of animals Gaurea also known as Pasupati.

Names
It coincides with Govardhan Puja of North India. It is also known as Bandna festival.

Celebration
Sohrai is harvest festival celebrated after harvest. The festival is celebrated on Amavasya(new moon) in the Hindu month of Kartik(October–November). 
The feast is celebrated in the honour of cattle especially bullocks, buffalos, goats and sheep. On the day people fast throughout the day, earthen lamps lits on homes, cattle sheds, kitchen and garden. On the festival day, those animals are bathed, their horn and foreheads are anointed with vermillion diluted in oils. They are offered special food of rice and vegetables. Sacrifice is offered to deity Gaurea (Spirit of cowshed) of black chicken and Tapan (Fermentated rice drink) in evening. Then the meat of chicken is eaten with bread and Tapan. Sohrai is day to express gratitude and affection for livestocks.
The harvest festival is the time of the year when they exhibit their artistic skills and expressions. Every year, after the festival  is over, the drawings and patterns created during this time are erased. This festival usually takes place in the month October or November for three days.  The festival coincide with Diwali. Some santal celebrate in January.

Arts 

An indigenous art form is practised by the Santal women. Ritualistic art is done on mud walls to welcome the harvest and to celebrate the cattle. The women clean their houses and decorate their walls with murals of Sohrai arts. This art form has continued since 10,000-4,000 BC. It was prevalent mostly in caves, but shifted to houses with mud walls.

This Sohrai art form can be monochromatic or colorful. The people coat the wall with a layer of white mud, and while the layer is still wet, they draw with their fingertips on it. Their designs range from flowers and fruits to various other nature-inspired designs. The cow dung that was earlier used to cake the walls of the house is used to add colour. The dark outline is visible due to the previously applied contrasting white mud coat. Sohrai artists are spontaneous in their drawing. Little pre-planning is evident. The canvases range up to 12 x 18 feet..The designs are usually drawn from the artist's memory. The personal experience of the artist and their interaction with nature are the biggest influence.

References 

Festivals in India
Festivals in Jharkhand
Hindu festivals
Culture of Jharkhand
Nagpuri culture